His Trust Fulfilled is a 1911 American drama film directed by  D. W. Griffith. Prints of this film survive in the film archives of the Library of Congress and the Museum of Modern Art.

Cast

 Wilfred Lucas – George
 Claire McDowell – Mrs. Frazier (the dying mother)
 Gladys Egan – The Little Orphan
 Dorothy West – The Frazier child, as an adult
 Verner Clarges – John Gray (the lawyer)
 Linda Arvidson
 Dorothy Bernard
 Clara T. Bracy – Freed slave/Woman in wedding group
 Kate Bruce
 Adele DeGarde – The Frazier child
 John T. Dillon – Man in wedding group (as Jack Dillon)
 Guy Hedlund – Freed slave/Man in wedding group
 Dell Henderson
 Grace Henderson – The landlady
 Harry Hyde – The English cousin
 Adolph Lestina – Freed slave
 Jeanie MacPherson – Woman in wedding group
 Violet Mersereau
 Jack Pickford – Black messenger
 Mack Sennett
 Marion Sunshine – Woman in wedding group

See also
 1911 in film
 D. W. Griffith filmography

References

External links

 His Trust Fulfilled presented for download with its prequel (His Trust) at  Archive.org

1911 films
1911 short films
1911 drama films
Films directed by D. W. Griffith
American silent short films
American black-and-white films
Biograph Company films
Silent American drama films
American Civil War films
1910s American films